Savino Guglielmetti (26 November 1911 – 23 January 2006) was an Italian gymnast. He competed at the 1932, 1936 and 1948 Olympics and won two gold medals in 1932.

Biography
A taxi ran over Guglielmetti when he was a child, but he escaped unharmed. He later fell from a four-story building, but managed to cling on power cables and survived. Originally a pole vaulter, he joined a gymnastics club in 1927, where he was coached by Mario Corrias. Three years later he became a member of the national team. Although he won two Olympic gold medals in 1932, he faced a strong competition in Italy, and won his first national all-around title only in 1934. He defended it in 1935, 1937, 1938 and 1939.

In 1998 Guglielmetti was inducted into the International Gymnastics Hall of Fame, and in 2000 received the Olympic Order in Silver.

References

1911 births
2006 deaths
Italian male artistic gymnasts
Gymnasts at the 1932 Summer Olympics
Gymnasts at the 1936 Summer Olympics
Gymnasts at the 1948 Summer Olympics
Olympic gymnasts of Italy
Olympic gold medalists for Italy
Olympic medalists in gymnastics
Gymnasts from Milan
Medalists at the 1932 Summer Olympics